Cheriya Kallanum Valiya Policeum is a 2010 Malayalam-language film directed by Haridas Kesavan. Mukesh, Dhanya Mary Varghese, Jagadish and Suraj Venjaramood star.

Synopsis 
This film tells the story of the mysterious Sadasivan who walks into a house at a village called Pancharakkara, knowing that the man of the house Kumaran has committed suicide. Soon he becomes dear to everyone around, and is a big help to Kumaran's widow Soumini who has been left adrift after her husband's demise.

The movie is set around the house. The Panchayat President sneaks around with ulterior motives in mind at midnight. The local tea shop owner, the tailor and the drunkard are involved.

Kuttappan, a blind man, hops into a car to show the guests their way. He appears in almost every scene and throws in some big surprises.

Cast

References

External links 

2010 films
2010s Malayalam-language films